Tagg Flats is a census-designated place (CDP) in Delaware County, Oklahoma, United States. The population was 13 at the 2010 census.

Geography
Tagg Flats is located in southwestern Delaware County at  (36.354059, -94.907661). It is on the south side of Lake Eucha and is bordered to the west by Old Eucha and to the south by Bull Hollow.

Demographics

As of the census of 2000, there were 11 people, 6 households, and 1 family residing in the CDP. The population density was 2.2 people per square mile (0.8/km2). There were 7 housing units at an average density of 1.4/sq mi (0.5/km2). The racial makeup of the CDP was 54.55% White, 36.36% Native American, and 9.09% from two or more races.

There were 6 households, out of which 33.3% had children under the age of 18 living with them, none were married couples  living together, 16.7% had a female householder with no husband present, and 66.7% were non-families. 50.0% of all households were made up of individuals, and none had someone living alone who was 65 years of age or older. The average household size was 1.83 and the average family size was 2.50.

In the CDP, the population was spread out, with 18.2% under the age of 18, 9.1% from 18 to 24, 27.3% from 25 to 44, 27.3% from 45 to 64, and 18.2% who were 65 years of age or older. The median age was 44 years. For every 100 females, there were 175.0 males. For every 100 females age 18 and over, there were 200.0 males.

The median income for a household in the CDP was $0, and the median income for a family was $8,750. Males had a median income of $6,250 versus $0 for females. The per capita income for the CDP was $2,774. There were 50.0% of families and 52.6% of the population living below the poverty line, including 50.0% of those under 18 and none of those over 64.

The per capita income in Tagg Flats makes it the seventh-poorest place in the United States.

References

Census-designated places in Oklahoma
Census-designated places in Delaware County, Oklahoma